Bobrowice  is a village in the administrative district of Gmina Szprotawa, Żagań County, Lubusz Voivodeship, Poland.

References

Villages in Żagań County